Mattaur, also known as Kamagata Maru Nagar is a village in Mohali, India between the 70 and 71 sectors of Mohali.

Mattaur is sometimes called the "Milky Village" or "Dairy Village," because there are Buffalo farmed in the area.

History

Kamagata Maru Nagar hosted the All-India Congress session in 1975. Among other Congress stalwarts, Mrs Indira Gandhi, the then Prime Minister, had attended the session. Mrs Gandhi had announced conversion of this historical village into a model gram. But till date it not made.

The agriculture land of this village acquired for development of Chandigarh, so number of the farmers migrated to other states like Haryana, UP and other districts of Punjab.

Infrastructure
Mattaur has a fairly good sewage system, and it does not display water or electricity problems, but the village needs to improve its infrastructure. Garbage dumps are not well maintained. Roads are not well maintained. The town does not have a reliable supply of potable water.

The village has two government schools for its residents, having good infrastructure. Many private schools are also there surrounding the village. Earlier the "milky village" is now a shelter or second home for techies working in IT companies in nearby industrial area like Phase 7,phase 8,8b and sector 66 bestech towers.

 

Today Mattaur is most developed village. The village has India's most trusted bank State Bank of India in its vicinity. Youngsters are well educated and studying in reputed universities in and outside the country. Its location is very much utmost. Mattaur has got beautiful buildings and park. Ivy hospital, Saint Xavier school, police station are just at its doorstep.

Many other prominent places like "Radha Swami Bhawan", "District Session Court", "District Administrative Complex", famous gurudwara "Singh Saheedan sahib" and Fortis Hospital are just within 1-2 kilometers from here. Political parties Congress and Shiromani Akali Dal has strong hold here with lot of supporters. The village has played important role in the politics of Punjab (India) before and after freedom.

Religious places belonging to every religion are key attractions of this village .Hindu temples "Shri Satya Narayan Mandir" & "Shri Baba Bal Bharti" are built with lot of facilities and langar halls. Shri Krishna Temple built in pound attracts many outsiders and people nearby. The village has nicely built "Gurudwara Sahib" in its vicinity. "Noorani Masjid" has been built aesthetically, many Muslim jamati peoples visit here every year as a part of their religious curriculum. A "Church" has also been set up by Christian people inside village.

References

Neighbourhoods of Mohali
Villages in Sahibzada Ajit Singh Nagar district